St Albans was a parliamentary electorate in Christchurch, New Zealand from 1881 to 1890, then from 1946 to 1996.

Population centres
The previous electoral redistribution was undertaken in 1875 for the 1875–1876 election. In the six years since, New Zealand's European population had increased by 65%. In the 1881 electoral redistribution, the House of Representatives increased the number of European representatives to 91 (up from 84 since the 1875–76 election). The number of Māori electorates was held at four. The House further decided that electorates should not have more than one representative, which led to 35 new electorates being formed, including St Albans, and two electorates that had previously been abolished to be recreated. This necessitated a major disruption to existing boundaries.

The 1941 New Zealand census had been postponed due to World War II, so the 1946 electoral redistribution had to take ten years of population growth and movements into account. The North Island gained a further two electorates from the South Island due to faster population growth. The abolition of the country quota through the Electoral Amendment Act, 1945 reduced the number and increased the size of rural electorates. None of the existing electorates remained unchanged, 27 electorates were abolished, 19 electorates were created for the first time, and eight former electorates were re-established, including St Albans.

The electorate was centred on the Christchurch suburb of St Albans.

History
The electorate was first created for the 1881 general election, held on 9 December.

John Evans Brown contested the electorate with J. L. Wilson and A. W. O'Neill. They received 218, 168 and 85 votes, respectively. Brown was declared elected. Brown did not stand for re-election in the 1884 general election.

In 1884 general election, held on 22 July, Francis James Garrick successfully stood for the electorate against two other candidates and obtained a comfortable victory, gaining 396 out of 477 votes. Garrick stood again in the electorate in the 1887 general election, against William Pember Reeves. At the election on 26 September, Reeves and Garrick received 802 and 634 votes, respectively. With a majority of 164 votes, Reeves was the successful candidate. The electorate was abolished at the end of the parliamentary term in 1890 and Reeves successfully contested the Christchurch electorate.

The electorate was recreated in 1946. Jack Watts from the National Party was the representative from 1946 to 1957, when he successfully contested the Fendalton electorate. St Albans went to Neville Pickering of the Labour Party, who lost the electorate at the next election in 1960 to National's Bert Walker. Walker represented St Albans until 1969, when he successfully contested the Papanui electorate.

St Albans was won by Labour's Roger Drayton in the 1969 general election. He retired after three terms, and the 1978 general election was won by Labour's David Caygill, who held the electorate until it was abolished in 1996.

Members of Parliament
The electorate was represented by eight Members of Parliament:

Key

Election results

1993 election

1990 election

1987 election

1984 election

1981 election

1978 election

1975 election

1972 election

1969 election

1966 election

1963 election

1960 election

1957 election

1954 election

1951 election

1949 election

1946 election

Notes

References

1881 establishments in New Zealand
1996 disestablishments in New Zealand
Historical electorates of New Zealand
Politics of Christchurch
History of Christchurch
1946 establishments in New Zealand
1890 disestablishments in New Zealand